Institutional Investor magazine is a periodical published by Euromoney Institutional Investor. It was founded in 1967 by Gilbert E. Kaplan. A separate international edition of the magazine was established in 1976 for readers in Europe and Asia.

History
Capital Cities Communications purchased the magazine in early 1984. The Walt Disney Company bought Capital Cities in 1996 and sold the magazine to Euromoney one year later. Institutional Investor has offices in New York City, London and Hong Kong. In 2018, Institutional Investor became digital only. 

In March 2021, it was announced that Diane Alfano, the CEO of Institutional Investor, would be stepping down effective June 30, 2021. Alfano has worked at Institutional Investor since 1984. According to the announcement, her resignation comes as Euromoney, the publication's publicly-traded parent company, plans to merge Institutional Investor with sister companies BCA Research and NDR into an asset management division. As of May 2021, the CEO of the new unit is Francis Cashman.

Research and Rankings 
Institutional Investor publishes global research and issues rankings throughout the year that often serve as industry benchmarks. Top-line results are published in the magazine while the full details are available on institutionalinvestor.com. The rankings include:

Executive Teams

 The All-America Executive Team
 The All-Europe Executive Team
 The All-Asia Executive Team (excludes Japan)
 The All-Japan Executive Team
 The Latin America Executive Team

Research Teams

 The All-America Research Team
 The All-Europe Research Team
 The All-Asia Research Team (excludes Japan)
 The All-Japan Research Team
 The All-China Research Team
 The Latin America Research Team
 The All-Brazil Research Team
 The All-India Research Team
 The All-America Fixed-Income Research Team
 The All-America Research Team Rising Stars
 The All-Europe Fixed-Income Research Team
 America's Top Corporate Access Providers
 Asia's Top Corporate Access Providers
 The Emerging EMEA Research Team
 Europe's Top Corporate Access Providers
 Japan's Top Corporate Access Providers

References

External links
 Official website

Business magazines published in the United States
Monthly magazines published in the United States
Institutional investors
Magazines established in 1967
Magazines published in New York City
Professional and trade magazines